Good Men and True is a lost 1922 American silent Western film starring Harry Carey. The film was directed by Val Paul and the supporting cast includes Noah Beery, Sr. and Tully Marshall.

Cast
 Harry Carey as J. Wesley Pringle
 Vola Vale as Georgie Hibbler
 Thomas Jefferson as Simon Hibbler
 Noah Beery as S.S. Thorpe
 Charles Le Moyne as Bowerman (as Charles J. LeMoyne)
 Tully Marshall as Fite
 Helen Gilmore as Mrs Fite

See also
 Harry Carey filmography

References

External links
 
 

1922 films
1922 Western (genre) films
1922 lost films
American black-and-white films
Films directed by Val Paul
Lost Western (genre) films
Lost American films
Film Booking Offices of America films
Silent American Western (genre) films
1920s American films